In enzymology, a succinyl-CoA:(R)-benzylsuccinate CoA-transferase is an enzyme that catalyzes the chemical reaction

succinyl-CoA + (R)-2-benzylsuccinate  succinate + (R)-2-benzylsuccinyl-CoA

Thus, the two substrates of this enzyme are succinyl-CoA and (R)-2-benzylsuccinate, whereas its two products are succinate and (R)-2-benzylsuccinyl-CoA.

This enzyme belongs to the family of transferases, specifically the CoA-transferases.  The systematic name of this enzyme class is succinyl-CoA:(R)-2-benzylsuccinate CoA-transferase. This enzyme is also called benzylsuccinate CoA-transferase.  This enzyme participates in benzoate degradation via coa ligation.

References

 
 
 
 

EC 2.8.3
Enzymes of unknown structure